Needle & Bubble is the first and only compilation album by South Korean boy band NU'EST. It was released on March 15, 2022, through Pledis Entertainment. The album consists of ten tracks of remastered and alternative versions of the group's previous songs, including "Again", serving as its lead single. Needle & Bubble is the last release by the group before completing their ten-year contract and officially disbanding on the same day.

Track listing

Charts

Weekly charts

Monthly charts

References

NU'EST albums
2022 compilation albums